James Blake was the defending champion, but was eliminated in the round robin competition.

Lleyton Hewitt won the title, defeating Jürgen Melzer 6–4, 7–6(12–10) in the final.

Seeds

 James Blake (round robin)
 Lleyton Hewitt (champion)
 Marat Safin (semifinals)
 Jürgen Melzer (final)
 Fernando Verdasco (quarterfinals)
 Julien Benneteau (round robin)
 Tim Henman (round robin)
 Benjamin Becker (round robin)

Draw

Finals

Round robin

As del Potro retired on his last match, Korolev advanced to Quarterfinals based on head-to-head results against Blake.

Elimination round
Prior to the round robin and after the completion of the qualifying draws, the 16 players with the lowest tier in the tournament (4 qualifiers, 2 wild cards, 1 lucky loser and 9 based on ATP rankings) competed in the elimination round in order to get one of the 8 last spots into the round robin competition. Winners in this round entered as main entrants.

RR-LL :Lu entered the round robin competition as lucky loser.

Qualifying

Seeds

 Danai Udomchoke (qualified)
 Chris Guccione (qualifying competition, lucky loser)
 Ilija Bozoljac (qualifying competition)
 Paul Capdeville (qualified)
 Wesley Moodie (qualified)
 Zack Fleishman (qualifying competition)
 Ramón Delgado (qualifying competition)
 Alex Bogdanovic (qualified)

Qualifiers

Lucky loser
  Chris Guccione

Qualifying draw

First qualifier

Second qualifier

Third qualifier

Fourth qualifier

External links
 Main draw (ATP)
 Elimination rounds (ATP)
 Qualifying draw (ATP)

Mens Singles